Henry II of Hesse (German: Heinrich), (c. 1299 – 3 June 1376) called "the Iron" was Landgrave of Hesse from 1328–1376.

Henry was the son of Otto I, Landgrave of Hesse and Adelheid of Ravensburg. With his wife Elisabeth of Thuringia, daughter of Frederick I, Margrave of Meissen, he had five children:

 Otto the Younger (1322c-1366)
 Adelheid (1323/24-1370) later wife of Casimir III of Poland
 Elisabeth [1329c-1390] later wife of Ernest I, Duke of Brunswick-Göttingen
 Jutta/Judith; died in infancy
 Margarethe, a nun in Haidau monastery

When Henry's son Otto died in 1366, his nephew Hermann was named co-regent. This caused fighting to break out with Otto of Brunswick.  To defray the costs of the conflict with Brunswick, Henry levied a tax on all imported goods.

External links
Wikisource: Allgemeine Deutsch Biographie "Heinrich II. (Landgraf von Hessen)" (in German)
Landgraf Regesten Online: Landgrave Henry II (the Iron)

|-

Landgraves of Hesse
House of Hesse
Burials at St. Elizabeth's Church, Marburg
1299 births
1376 deaths